Marcelino García Alonso (born 1971 in Oviedo, Asturias) is a Spanish former professional road cyclist. He rode for the Danish professional cycling team, which he joined coming from Spanish Team ONCE. He rode for the Danish team until 2002, where he went to another Spanish team, Labarca 2–Cafés Baqué. Since retiring, he works as a Tour Guide during the Grand Tours in the summer months throughout Europe.

Major results

1995
 8th Overall Vuelta a los Valles Mineros
1996
 3rd Overall Euskal Bizikleta
1st Stage 3
 3rd Overall GP Tell
 3rd Overall Vuelta Asturias
 7th Overall Volta a Catalunya
 9th Overall Tour de l'Avenir
1997
 1st  Overall Critérium International
1st Stage 2
1998
 1st  Overall Vuelta a Andalucía
1st Stage 3
2000
 5th Overall Vuelta Asturias
2001
 1st Stage 3 Hessen Rundfahrt

External links
 Official website
Photo: http://www.painetworks.com/photos/hd/hd0114.JPG
Photo: http://grahamwatson.com/2001/flechew/image7.html

1971 births
Living people
Sportspeople from Oviedo
Cyclists from Asturias
Spanish male cyclists